Earbuds may refer to:

 Cotton swab, a small wad of cotton wrapped around one or both ends of a short plastic rod
 Earphone(s), a pair of small listening devices